Right Bank generally refers to the bank of a river or other body of water that is on the right side when facing downstream. It may specifically refer to:

 Right Bank (Biscay), the right bank of the Nervión in Biscay, Spain
 Right-bank Ukraine, a historical region in Ukraine
 Right Bank (Bordeaux), a wine region in France
 Rive Droite, the northern bank of the Seine in Paris, France

See also

 Bank (geography)
 Left Bank (disambiguation)